Abdulah Sidran (born 2 October 1944), often referred to by his hypocoristic nickname Avdo, is a Bosnian poet and screenwriter. He is best known for writing the poetry book Sarajevski Tabut and the scripts for When Father Was Away on Business and Do You Remember Dolly Bell?.

Early life and family
Abdulah Sidran, the second of four children, was born in Sarajevo, Bosnia and Herzegovina on 2 October 1944, although several sources inaccurately give his date of birth as 29 September 1944. He was born to Bosnian Muslim parents; father Mehmed Sidran (1915–1965) was born in Kiseljak and worked as a locksmith at a railway workshop, while his mother Behija (née Jukić) was a housewife. Sidran has three siblings Ekrem (born 1942; deceased), Nedim (born 4 February 1947) and Edina (born 1953). He was named after his paternal uncle, a typographer and compositor, who perished in 1943 at the Jasenovac concentration camp. The Sidran family roots trace back to the hamlet Biograd near Nevesinje, Bosnia and Herzegovina. Abdulah's paternal grandfather Hasan Sidran relocated to Sarajevo from Belgrade in 1903.

Personal life
After spending most of his life in Sarajevo, Sidran lived in Goražde before moving to a small village near Tešanj where he currently lives.

In 2019, Sidran, together with some thirty world intellectuals met with French President Emmanuel Macron. A meeting of world intellectuals with the president of France was initiated by the prominent French philosopher, writer and journalist Bernard-Henri Levy.

Works
His major works include Šahbaza, Bone and Meat, The Sarajevo Tomb (Sarajevski tabut), Why is Venice Sinking (Zašto tone Venecija), several books of poetry, and screenplays for movies from the former Yugoslavia, such as When Father Was Away on Business and Do You Remember Dolly Bell?, directed by Emir Kusturica, and Kuduz, directed by Ademir Kenović.

References

External links

1944 births
Living people
Writers from Sarajevo
Bosniaks of Bosnia and Herzegovina
Bosnia and Herzegovina Muslims
20th-century male writers
Yugoslav screenwriters
Bosnia and Herzegovina screenwriters
Male screenwriters
Yugoslav poets
Bosnia and Herzegovina poets
Bosniak poets
Golden Arena winners
Bosnia and Herzegovina male writers